Joel Tobeck (born 2 June 1971 in Auckland, New Zealand) is an actor known for his roles in the television series Tangle, The Doctor Blake Mysteries, Xena Warrior Princess, Hercules: The Legendary Journeys, and Young Hercules and Sons of Anarchy. In 2016 Tobeck began performing as the demon Baal on the show Ash vs Evil Dead.

Tobeck lives in Cambridge with his partner Yvette, with whom he has three children.

Career
Tobeck  is known for his roles in the television series Tangle, The Doctor Blake Mysteries, Xena Warrior Princess, Hercules: The Legendary Journeys, Young Hercules and Sons of Anarchy. In 2016 Tobeck began performing as the demon Baal on the show Ash vs Evil Dead.

Just before playing ethical police superintendent Lawson of the 1950s and 1960s in The Doctor Blake Mysteries from 2013 to 2017, he took a turn playing a crooked cop of the 1920s in one episode, Blood and Circuses, in the Miss Fisher’s Murder Mysteries, the 11th episode of the first series, in 2012.

Personal life
Tobeck lives in Cambridge with his partner Yvette, with whom he has three children. He is the son of actress Liddy Holloway, and the grandson of former Labour Party minister Phil Holloway.

Filmography

Films

Television series

References

External links 
 

New Zealand male film actors
New Zealand male television actors
New Zealand male soap opera actors
1971 births
Living people
20th-century New Zealand male actors
21st-century New Zealand male actors